Santiago ("El Pollo") Fernández (born 23 September 1976, in San Fernando) is a rower from Argentina. He competed in four Summer Olympics for Argentina: 1996, 2004, 2008, and 2012. Santiago won two gold medals at the Pan American Games. In 2010 he was granted the Konex Award Merit Diploma as one of the five best rowers of the last decade in Argentina.

References

1976 births
Argentine male rowers
Rowers at the 1996 Summer Olympics
Rowers at the 2004 Summer Olympics
Rowers at the 2007 Pan American Games
Rowers at the 2008 Summer Olympics
Rowers at the 2011 Pan American Games
Rowers at the 2012 Summer Olympics
Olympic rowers of Argentina
Rowers from Buenos Aires
Living people
Pan American Games gold medalists for Argentina
Pan American Games silver medalists for Argentina
Pan American Games medalists in rowing
South American Games gold medalists for Argentina
South American Games medalists in rowing
Competitors at the 2010 South American Games
Medalists at the 2007 Pan American Games
Medalists at the 2011 Pan American Games